Allotinus major, the major darkie, is a small butterfly found in Sulawesi that belongs to the lycaenids or blues family.

Range
This species resides in Sulawesi, Sangihe, Banggai (Peleng) and Sula (Mangole).

Taxonomy
Along with Allotinus maximus this species forms the major group of Allotinus, which is restricted to the Sulawesi region.

Gallery

Cited references

Allotinus
Butterflies of Indonesia
Butterflies described in 1865